Holy Heathens and the Old Green Man is an album by Waterson–Carthy.

There is more instrumental accompaniment on this collection than on any previous Waterson–Carthy album. Tracks 13 and 16 could even be mistaken for the work of Brass Monkey. Despite the title, almost all the songs have a Christian flavour. "Diadem" has phrases which suggest that the figure being adored is some kind of "Green Man" rather than Christ. They have mostly avoided familiar carols, and even where the words as well-known, they have selected unfamiliar tunes. Running time 59 minutes 47 seconds. The album was recorded and released on the Topic Records label in 2006.

Track listing 

"New Year Carol – Residue" (Traditional) (2:57)
The meaning of the title "Residue" is unknown: the traditional song is titled "Levy-Dew", and this variant may be a mondegreen .
"Sugar Wassail" (Traditional) (2:12)
From the collection of Rev. John Broadwood.
"St George" (John Kirkpatrick) (2:50)
Kirkpatrick's song is similar to words in the Mummer's Play
"May Song" (Traditional) (2:44)
From Fred Hamer's collection, combining the "Night Song" and the "Day Song" into one.
"Christ Made a Trance" (Traditional) (2:32)
Solo from Martin Carthy. A grim Passiontide vision of Christ's pain
"When Jesus Wept The Falling Tear" (W Billings) (2:24)
Sung as a round. (William Billings (1746 - 1800, Boston) is regarded as the first American choral composer.)
"Cherry Tree Carol" (Traditional) (4:20)
A song for Epiphany.
"Reaphook and Sickle" (Traditional) (2:48)
A song for the end of harvest
"Jack Frost" (Mike Waterson) (4:33)
Eliza sings lead. A description of a frosty scene
"While Shepherds Watched Their Flocks" (Words: Nahum Tate / Tune: Traditional) (5:17)
Sung to one of the many traditional tunes found in Yorkshire - this version was collected from the singing of Walter Pardon.
"On Christmas Day It Happened So" (Traditional) (2:43)
From Hamer's "Garners Gay". Sung by Tim van Eyken. A ploughman is punished for ploughing on Christmas Day.
"Time to Remember the Poor" (Words: John Fielding / Music: H. T. Dyring) (4:40)
A poetic plea for charity.
"Jacobstowe Wassail" (Traditional) (2:50)
A Wassail song from the Devon village of Jacobstowe, from the Baring-Gould collection.
"Awake Awake" (Traditional) (4:06)
Not the same song as the one by Steelye Span.
"Diadem" (Traditional) (3:28)
From Yorkshire. Christ portrayed as a king.
"Jolly Old Hawk" (Traditional) (2:51)
A Somerset carol from The Twelve Days of Christmas family of songs.
"Gloryland (Baptist hymn)" (Sankey) (3:40)
A flowing, soaring description of heaven.

Musicians 

Norma Waterson (vocals, triangle)
Eliza Carthy (vocals, fiddle, mandolin)
Martin Carthy (vocals, guitar)
Tim Van Eyken (vocals, melodeons)

also for "The Devil's Interval":
Jim Causley (vocals)
Emily Portman (vocals)
Lauren McCormick (vocals)

also:
Martin Brinsford (percussion) (on 4,8,13 and 16)
Alice Kinloch (trombone, tuba) (on 4,8,11,13 and 16)
James Killingsworth (bass, cello) (on 4, and 13)
Tom Allan (trumpets) (on 4,8,11,13 and 16)
Oliver Knight (cello) (on 4,8,11,13 and 16)

References

External links

Waterson–Carthy albums
2006 albums
Topic Records albums